Flabellula is a genus of Amoebozoa.

It is sometimes spelled "Flabelulla".

References

Amoebozoa genera